The red-shouldered tanager (Tachyphonus phoenicius) is a species of bird in the family Thraupidae.

It is found in Bolivia, Brazil, Colombia, Ecuador, French Guiana, Guyana, Peru, Suriname, and Venezuela. Its natural habitats are subtropical or tropical dry shrubland and subtropical or tropical seasonally wet or flooded lowland grassland.

References

red-shouldered tanager
Birds of the Amazon Basin
Birds of the Colombian Amazon
Birds of the Venezuelan Amazon
red-shouldered tanager
red-shouldered tanager
Taxonomy articles created by Polbot